A cereal killer may refer to any pest or disease of cereals.

Cereal Killer may also refer to:

People and characters
 "Cereal Killer", the stage name of a roller derby skater for the Australian roller derby team Victoria Men's Roller Derby (Sports Team)

 "Cereal Killer", a movie character from the film Hackers
 "Cereal Killer", a fictional character from Habit Heroes

Music
 The Cereal Killers (musical), a 1993 stage musical by D'Arcy Drollinger

Albums
 Cereal Killers (album), a 1991 album by Too Much Joy
 Cereal Killer (album), a 1992 video album by Green Jellö
 Cereal Killer Soundtrack (album), a 1993 album by Green Jelly, for their 1992 video album

Songs
 "Cereal Killer" (song), a song by Green Jello off the eponymous video album Cereal Killer (album) and soundtrack album Cereal Killer Soundtrack
 "Cereal Killer" (song), a 1993 song by Geto Boys off the album Till Death Do Us Part (Geto Boys album)
 "Cereal Killer" (song), a song by Quincy Punx; see the 1995 album Punk Sucks
 "Cereal Killer" (song), a 1998 song by Tobin Sprout off the album Wax Nails
 "Cereal Killer" (song), a 2009 song by Method Man & Redman from the album Blackout! (Method Man & Redman album)

Television
 "The Cereal Killer", a 1987 episode of the television series The Oldest Rookie
 "Cereal Killer", a 2005 episode of Forensic Files (season 10) television series
 "Cereal Killer", a 2006 episode of The Apprentice (American season 5) television series
 "Cereal Killer", a 2006 segment of Robot Chicken (season 2) television series
 "Cereal Killer", a 2013 segment of Cartoon Planet; see List of Cartoon Planet episodes
 "Cereal Killer", a 2013 episode of the television series The High Fructose Adventures of Annoying Orange; see List of The High Fructose Adventures of Annoying Orange episodes
 "Cereal Killer", a 2015 episode of the television series Battle Creek (TV series)

Other uses
 Cereal Killer Cafe, a former cafe in London
 "Cereal Killer", a flavor of donut from the Cambpell, California donut shop Psycho Donuts
 "Cereal Killer", a fictional game from the 2008 TV episode "Dangerous Curves" (The Simpsons) of the U.S. TV show The Simpsons

See also

 
 Cereal (disambiguation)
 Killer (disambiguation)
 Serial killer (disambiguation)